Warm milk is milk that has been heated above room temperature. It is commonly used as a nightcap for children and people who abstain from alcohol. Its effectiveness as such is disputed.

As a nightcap 
Warm milk is commonly touted as a sleep aid for those who do not drink alcohol, such as children and those abstaining for religious reasons. Many people do not like the taste compared to cold milk. It is common for these people to add honey or vanilla, though vanilla extract contains about 45% alcohol. The reason for its recommendation is that it contains tryptophan, which the body uses to make melatonin, and calcium. However, tryptophan does not cross the brain-blood barrier without carbohydrates, which is recommended not to eat before bed. Some experts say that warm milk does not actually make the drinker sleepy, it only helps them relax.

References 

Milk